Vretstorp is a locality situated in Hallsberg Municipality, Örebro County, Sweden with 842 inhabitants in 2010.

References 

Populated places in Örebro County
Populated places in Hallsberg Municipality